Walnut Point State Park is an Illinois state park on  in Douglas County, Illinois, United States.

References

State parks of Illinois
Protected areas of Douglas County, Illinois
Protected areas established in 1968
1968 establishments in Illinois